Jo Bole So Nihaal (also transliterated as Jo Bole So Nihal; literally meaning "Whoever utters shall be fulfilled") is a 2005 Indian action comedy film, directed by Rahul Rawail. It stars Sunny Deol, Shillpi Sharma and Kamaal Khan, whilst Nupur Mehta and Surekha Sikri appear in major supporting roles; the director also plays an role in the film. this was singer Kamaal Khan's debut film as an actor.

The film's release was met by protests from few Sikh groups, who took offense at its use of a Sikh religious phrase as its title. Two bomb attacks on 22 May 2005 on theatres in New Delhi showing the film killed one person and injured 49, prompting cinema owners to pull the film, in some cases voluntarily and in some states as a result of a government order.

Plot
Nihaal Singh (Sunny Deol) is an honest and beloved constable from Punjab.

A chance encounter with the criminal Romeo (Kamaal Khan) changes his life forever. Romeo is an unstoppable mercenary who moves from country to country in a wave of terror. When Nihaal Singh unwittingly aids the terrorist in his escape, Nihaal is labeled a traitor. He finds himself suspended from his job, ridiculed, and hated by his village.

Meanwhile, Romeo has taken his merciless campaign to New York City. Intelligence reports reveal that Romeo has entered the US in a plot to kill the President. Now, the FBI is desperate to find Romeo, but the villain is a man without a face and therefore invisible. The only person who knows what the menace looks like is Nihaal Singh.

The FBI recruits Nihaal Singh to come to New York and aid them in capturing Romeo. Guided by bilingual FBI Agents Suzanne Kaur (Shilpi Sharma) and Manoj Bhatnagar (Thomas Tevana) among others. Later, Nihaal and Suzanne fall in love. Nihaal hunts Romeo for the safety of America. He asks for one thing in return for Romeo's capture: to bring the villain to his hometown in Punjab, thereby clearing his name and restoring his former glory.

Cast

 Sunny Deol as Constable Nihaal Singh
 Shillpi Sharma as FBI Agent Satinder "Suzanne" Kaur
 Kamaal Khan as Romeo / Sikander
 Nupur Mehta as Liza
 Thomas Tevana as FBI Agent Manoj Bhatnagar
 Surekha Sikri as Mrs. Balwanth Singh; Nihal's grandmother
 Surendra Pal as Balwanth Singh; Nihal's father
 Arun Bakshi as Rajinder Singh
 Valbona Coba as FBI Agent Tevana
 Gary Castro Churchwell FBI Agent Patrick Sykes
 Dolly Bindra as Nihal's friend/sister
 Kunal Vijaykar as Tayyab Ali (Nihal's brother-in-law)
 Rahul Rawail as Al Fatah, a terrorist
 Seth Harris Gordon as Naval Officer
 Yuan-Kwan Chan as Time Square Singer
 Dominique Kelley as Times Square Dancer
 Matt Dwyer as Victim on a motorcycle
 Michael Dean Russell, Jr. as an FBI Agent (uncredited)

Soundtrack

References

External links
 

2005 films
2000s Hindi-language films
Indian action comedy films
2005 action comedy films
Fictional portrayals of the Punjab Police (India)
Films directed by Rahul Rawail
Films scored by Anand Raj Anand
T-Series (company) films
Indian films set in New York City
2005 comedy films